Mary Teresa Josephine Webber,  is a British palaeographer, medievalist, and academic. She has been a Fellow of Trinity College, Cambridge since 1997 and Professor of Palaeography at the Faculty of History, University of Cambridge since 2018. Webber studied Modern History as an undergraduate at Somerville College, Oxford.

Honours
In 2001, Webber was elected a Fellow of the Royal Historical Society (FRHistS). On 5 June 2003, she was elected a Fellow of the Society of Antiquaries of London (FSA). In July 2017, she was elected a Fellow of the British Academy (FBA), the United Kingdom's national academy for the humanities and social sciences.

From 2015 to 2016, Webber held the J. P. R. Lyell Reader in Bibliography at the University of Oxford. She therefore delivered the Lyell Lectures for that academic year: her lecture series was titled "Public Reading and its Books: Monastic Ideals and Practice in England c. 1000-c. 1300".

Selected works

References

Living people
Year of birth missing (living people)
British palaeographers
British medievalists
Women medievalists
Fellows of Trinity College, Cambridge
Members of the University of Cambridge faculty of history
Fellows of the British Academy
Fellows of the Society of Antiquaries of London
Fellows of the Royal Historical Society
British women historians
Alumni of Somerville College, Oxford